Hans Peter Schlickewei (born 1947) is a German mathematician, specializing in number theory and, in particular, the theory of transcendental numbers.

Schlickewei received his doctorate in 1975 at the University of Freiburg under the supervision of Theodor Schneider. Schlickewei is a professor at the University of Marburg.

He proved in 1976 the p-adic generalization of the subspace theorem of Wolfgang M. Schmidt. Schlickewei's theorem implies the Thue-Siegel-Roth theorem, whose p-adic analogue was already proved in 1958 by David Ridout.

In 1998, Schlickewei was an invited speaker with talk The Subspace Theorem and Applications at the International Congress of Mathematicians in Berlin.

Selected publications
 
 
 
 
 
 
 
 
 
 Approximation of algebraic numbers, pp. 107–170 in: D. Masser, Yu. V. Nesterenko, W. Schmidt, M. Waldschmidt (eds.): Diophantine Approximation, Lectures CIME Summer School 2000, Springer 2003

References

External links
 

1947 births
Living people
20th-century German mathematicians
21st-century German mathematicians
Number theorists
University of Freiburg alumni
Academic staff of the University of Marburg